Lara Arruabarrena and Irina-Camelia Begu were the defending champions but chose not to participate together. Begu teamed up with Raluca Olaru but lost in the semifinals to Kiki Bertens and Johanna Larsson.
Arruabarrena successfully defended the title alongside Andreja Klepač, defeating Kiki Bertens and Johanna Larsson in the final, 2–6, 6–3, [10–6].

Seeds

Draw

References 
 Draw

Korea Open - Doubles
2015 Doubles